Berthran Haktam or English name Bernard Hagan (born April 4, 1985, in Accra) is a Ghanaian footballer.

Career

Lokomotiv Plovdiv 
Haktam made his official debut for Lokomotiv Plovdiv in a match against Cherno More Varna on 14 September 2007. He played for 24 minutes. Loko won the match 2:1 with Haktam making a good first impression.

References

1985 births
Living people
Ghanaian footballers
Association football midfielders
Footballers from Accra
PFC Lokomotiv Plovdiv players
First Professional Football League (Bulgaria) players